Macrosamanea is a genus of flowering plant in the family Fabaceae. It belongs to the mimosoid clade of the subfamily Caesalpinioideae.

Species
Macrosamanea comprises the following species:
 Macrosamanea amplissima
 Macrosamanea consanguinea
 Macrosamanea discolor
 Macrosamanea duckei
 Macrosamanea froesii
 Macrosamanea kegelii  
 Macrosamanea macrocalyx
 Macrosamanea prancei

References

 
Fabaceae genera
Taxonomy articles created by Polbot